Bryan Kenneally (born 26 March 1942) is a former Australian rules footballer who played with Melbourne in the VFL during the 1960s.

Kenneally was a versatile footballer and played in Melbourne's 1960 and 1964 premiership sides, as a wingman and half forward flanker respectively. For the rest of his career he was a ruck-rover, filling the position vacated by Ron Barassi and he earned selection to the Victorian interstate team in 1967.

References

1942 births
Australian rules footballers from Victoria (Australia)
Melbourne Football Club players
Living people
Melbourne Football Club Premiership players
Two-time VFL/AFL Premiership players